Phoksundo Lake (pronounced ) is an alpine fresh water oligotrophic lake in Nepal's Shey Phoksundo National Park, located at an elevation of  in the Dolpa District.

In September 2007, Phoksundo Lake has been designated a Ramsar site.

On the lake' southern end, the village of Ringmo sits on the 30,000- to 40,000-year-old landslide dam that formed the lake.

Religious significance 
There are more than 20 stupas in the southern belt, and one gompa in the eastern side of the lake, where annual prayers and worship are carried out. Traditional Tibetan culture prevails in upper Dolpo; Buddhism and Bon are prevalent in lower Dolpo, including Ringmo village.

References

Lakes of Karnali Province
Ramsar sites in Nepal
Protected areas established in 2007
Landslide-dammed lakes

Lakes of Nepal